Rudolf Gerhardus Visagie (born 27 June 1959 in Nelspruit, South Africa) is a former South African rugby union player, who played lock.

Playing career
Visagie made his provincial debut for the Free State in 1980. He played 109 matches for Free State during the seven seasons with the union. In 1987, Visagie joined the Natal and also played 109 matches in seven seasons for Natal. After Natal, Visagie played for Lowveld and South Eastern Transvaal.

Visagie made his test debut for the Springboks in 1984 against the touring English team captained by John Scott. Visagie played in all four test matches during the 1984 season, after which nine years lapsed before his next test match in 1993 against France. Visagie also toured with the Springboks to Australia in 1993. He did not play in any tests during the 1993 tour, but played in 4 tour matches, scoring one try. He was known for his great ball- and running skills, and was a very strong scrummaging lock.

Test history

Trivia
With a weight of 138 kg, Visagie holds the record as the heaviest Springbok rugby player.

See also
List of South Africa national rugby union players – Springbok no. 536

References

1959 births
Living people
South African rugby union players
South Africa international rugby union players
Free State Cheetahs players
Sharks (Currie Cup) players
People from Mbombela
Rugby union players from Mpumalanga
Rugby union locks